Agujari or Aguiari is a surname. Notable people with the surname include:
 Eleonora Aguiari (born 1969), Italian installation artist and author
 Lucrezia Aguiari,  Italian coloratura soprano
 Giuseppe Agujari (1843–1885), Italian-Argentine painter
 Tito Agujari (1834–1908), Italian portraitist and history painter